Michael Veitch may refer to:
Michael Veitch (born 1962), Australian comedian, broadcaster and writer
Michael Veitch (politician) (born 1962), Australian politician
Michael Veitch (darts player) (born 1960), Scottish darts player